Henry Keith Ferrell (July 7, 1953–April 11, 2020) was an American author with over a dozen published works including science fiction/fantasy, biographical and video game guides. Ferrell also edited the popular Omni Magazine in the 1990s.

Omni Magazine
Omni Magazine was a highly celebrated science/science fiction magazine. Ferrell was its editor from 1990 to 1996.

Bibliography

Books
 H.G. Wells: First Citizen of the Future (1983)
 Ernest Hemingway: The Search for Courage (1984)
 George Orwell (1985)
 John Steinbeck: The Voice of the Land (1986)
 The Official Guide to Sid Meier's Civilization (1992)
 Passing Judgment (1996)
 Black Mist: And Other Japanese Futures with Orson Scott Card (1997)
 Tougher Times: A Practical Guide For Getting Through Them (2009)
 The Bane of Yoto - Bloodmoon: Birth of the Beast with Josh Viola (2012)

References

External links
, Keith Ferrell official site

20th-century American novelists
Living people
American science fiction writers
American fantasy writers
21st-century American novelists
American male novelists
20th-century American male writers
21st-century American male writers
Year of birth missing (living people)